Jack LoGiudice is an American television writer and producer, best known for his work on the FX series Sons of Anarchy and most recently worked as a co-executive producer and writer on  AMC's The Walking Dead.

Biography 
LoGiudice began his career working on The Dom DeLuise Show in 1987 before becoming a writer on shows like Dear John, 7th Heaven and Dellaventura through the 1990s. From 2000 onwards he has worked as a producer and writer for series such as Resurrection Blvd., Street Time, Sons of Anarchy and most recently completed work on The Walking Dead. In 2008 he co-wrote a television movie called Crash and Burn, which starred Erik Palladino and Michael Madsen. It was directed by Russell Mulcahy.

Filmography

Producer

Writer

References

External links 

American television writers
American male television writers
Television producers from Ohio
Living people
Writers from Youngstown, Ohio
Year of birth missing (living people)
Screenwriters from Ohio
Bowling Green State University alumni
20th-century American screenwriters
20th-century American male writers
21st-century American screenwriters
21st-century American male writers